Whitely is both a surname and a given name. Notable people with the name include:
 Anthony Leslie Whitely (born 1928) Photographer Perth and Adelaide, Australia 
 Bessie Marshall Whitely (1871-1944) American composer, pianist and teacher
 Johanna Whitely (born 1828)  First lay woman to found a Catholic school in Western Australia and has a small park named after her in York, Western Australia 
 John Francis Whitely (born 1858), First Deputy Federal Commissioner of Land Tax in Perth, Western Australia 
 Martin Whitely (born 1959), Australian politician
 Whitely King (19th century), Australian activist

See also
 Whitley (disambiguation)

References